Olha Basarab (1 September 1889 – 12 February 1924) was a Ukrainian political activist and member of the Ukrainian Military Organization who conducted both charitable and humanitarian work that was recognized by the International Red Cross, as well as military or intelligence work on behalf of the Ukrainian underground. She was an executive of the Ukrainian Women's Union branch in Lviv Ukraine. She was arrested by the Polish police after being accused of working with the Ukrainian Military Organization and of spying for Germany (with whom the Ukrainian Military Organization had a working relationship). Materials indicating cooperation with Germany's intelligence were found at her home.  Different accounts of her death in prison exist range from suicide to murder. Afterwards she was seen as a martyr and source of inspiration within the Ukrainian community.

Biography 
Olha Basarab was born Olha Levytska in 1889 into the family of petty gentry (coat-of-arms Rogala) near the town of Rohatyn.  In 1912 she attended a meeting organised by Konstantyna Malytska for the "Women's Committee" in Lviv to prepare for war. Others at the meeting were Olena Zalizniak (1886–1969), Maria Biletska (1864–1937) and Olena Stepaniv. The money raised from the "National Combat Fund" they recommended was used to fund the Ukrainian Sich Riflemen.

In 1914 she married Dmytry Basarab, who died fighting for Austria on the Italian front in 1915. During World War I, Basarab was a member of the first Women's Platoon of the Ukrainian Sich Riflemen, a unit of Ukrainian volunteers within the Austrian army.

After the war she worked in the years 1918-1923 as an accountant of Embassy of Ukraine in Vienna, she also visited Denmark, Germany, Norway and other states to collect military and political intelligence.
She was involved in charity work involving helping wounded soldiers and civilians, and was recognized by the International Red Cross for her efforts.  Active in Ukrainian political organizing, she helped organize Ukrainian soldiers and was a member of the Ukrainian Women's Union in Vienna and a member of the Supreme Executive of the Union of Ukrainian Women in Lviv.

In 1923 she started working with Ukrainian Military Organization, where her liaison was Colonel Eugene Konovalets. She was accused by the Polish authorities of working with intelligence from Germany and Bolshevik Ukraine in Poland and belonging to the Ukrainian Military Organization (UVO), which organised assassinations of Poles and Ukrainians. After her imprisonment, materials concerning cooperation with German intelligence were found (the UVO signed an agreement in May 1923 with Weimar Germany's intelligence service, according to which the UVO would conduct espionage work against Poland, while the German side was to provide financial aid and military equipment). She died in prison under unclear circumstances.

The Polish government was accused of torturing her to death, although this accusation was never conclusively proven.  Martha Bohachevsky-Chomiak from Canadian Institute of Ukrainian Studies claims the Polish government initially presented her death as a suicide but subsequent exhumation of her body showed that she had been murdered in their custody. Basarab's death resulted in protests from Ukrainians, demands for an inquiry from Ukrainian members of the Polish parliament, and calls from the Jewish members of the Polish parliament to investigate prisoner conditions in Polish jails. Her body was exhumed on 26 February, and the Polish forensic expert stated that she had died by hanging. He declined to publicly identify the bruises on her body as being the results of beatings, although his student stated that he had told her during the autopsy that Basarb's body showed traces of having been beaten. Rumors spread in Lviv that police tortured people through the use of electric shocks.

Notes

People from Rohatyn
People from the Kingdom of Galicia and Lodomeria
Women in European warfare
Women in World War I
Ukrainian people of World War I
Austro-Hungarian military personnel of World War I
Ukrainian Austro-Hungarians
Ukrainian politicians before 1991
Ukrainian people who died in prison custody
1924 deaths
1889 births
Prisoners who died in Polish detention